Lewis Foster (born 21 December 1993) is an English professional rugby league footballer who plays for the Leigh Centurions in the Kingstone Press Championship. He is on loan from the Leigh Centurions. His playing position is in the halves or as a Hooker.

Playing career
Foster made his senior début for the Leigh Centurions on 18 May 2014 in a Championship match against Doncaster.

He has played for the London Broncos, Oldham RLFC (Heritage № 1364) and the Rochdale Hornets on loan and the Sheffield Eagles on dual registration from the Leigh Centurions.

References

External links
London Broncos profile
Leigh Centurions profile

1993 births
Living people
English rugby league players
Leigh Leopards players
London Broncos players
Oldham R.L.F.C. players
Rochdale Hornets players
Rugby league hookers
Rugby league players from St Helens, Merseyside
Sheffield Eagles players
Whitehaven R.L.F.C. players